And Other Stories is an independent British book publisher founded in 2009, notable for being the first UK publisher of literary fiction to make direct, advance subscriptions a major part of its business model as well as for its use of foreign language reading groups to choose the books that it publishes. The company originally operated from High Wycombe, Buckinghamshire, but is now based in Sheffield, South Yorkshire. In 2012, it was nominated for the Newcomer of the Year award by the Independent Publishers Guild (IPG).

History
And Other Stories was founded in 2009 by Stefan Tobler.

And Other Stories first came to the public's attention when its first book, Down the Rabbit Hole by Juan Pablo Villalobos (translated by Rosalind Harvey), was chosen by the public to be one of the 10 titles longlisted for the 2011 Guardian First Book Award. It went on to make the shortlist and has also been shortlisted for the Oxford-Weidenfeld Translation Prize.

Deborah Levy's Swimming Home was shortlisted for the Man Booker Prize 2012, as well as UK Author of the Year at the Specsavers National Book Awards 2012. and the Jewish Quarterly-Wingate Prize 2013.

And Other Stories was nominated for and subsequently won Publisher of the Year in the 2011 3:AM Magazine Awards.

List of books
 All the Lights by Clemens Meyer
 Down the Rabbit Hole by Juan Pablo Villalobos
 Swimming Home by Deborah Levy
 Open Door by Iosi Havilio
 Happiness is Possible by Oleg Zaionchkovsky
 The Islands by Carlos Gamerro
 Zbinden's Progress by Christoph Simon
 Lightning Rods by Helen DeWitt
 Black Vodka by Deborah Levy
 Captain of the Steppe by Oleg Pavlov
 All Dogs are Blue by Rodrigo de Souza Leão
 Quesadillas by Juan Pablo Villalobos
 Paradises by Iosi Havilio
 Double Negative by Ivan Vladislavić

References

External links
 

 
 

2009 establishments in England
Book publishing companies of the United Kingdom
British companies established in 2009
Companies based in Buckinghamshire
High Wycombe
Publishing companies established in 2009